Hurka is a surname. Notable people with the surname include:

Martin Hurka (born 1993), Czech footballer
Mykhailo Hurka (born 1975), Ukrainian footballer and manager
Thomas Hurka (born 1952), Canadian philosopher

See also
Hůrka (Prague Metro)